Go For Wand (April 6, 1987 – October 27, 1990) was a champion American thoroughbred racehorse.

Go For Wand was sired by Canadian Hall of Famer Deputy Minister, out of Obeah (winner of, among other races, the Blue Hen Stakes, and the Delaware Handicap twice). She was foaled and raised at Jane du Pont Lunger's Christiana Stables. As a two-year-old, she had a record of three-for-four before winning the 1989 Breeders' Cup Juvenile Fillies. Her performances earned her the 1989 Eclipse Award for Outstanding Two-Year-Old Filly.

As a three-year-old, she was seven-for-nine and was voted the 1990 Eclipse Award for Outstanding Three-Year-Old Filly. In 1990 at Belmont Park she ran against the Argentinian mare Bayakoa in the Breeders' Cup Distaff. Go For Wand was leading by a head at the sixteenth pole when she suffered an open fracture to her right cannon bone. She fell to the track and threw jockey Randy Romero to the ground before rising to limp on three legs. Track personnel caught her and got her to lie down, and she was immediately euthanized on the track. The next day, she was buried in the infield at Saratoga racetrack.

Like the death of Ruffian at the same track, the accident was shown by NBC on live television, and reminded viewers of that promising filly who was fatally injured on the track. Several veterinarians estimate that she broke her leg about twelve strides before she fell, which would mean that she suffered her catastrophic injury while passing the flagpole next to which Ruffian was buried.

In 1992, the Maskette Stakes, a Grade 1 handicap race for fillies and mares, was renamed the "Go For Wand Handicap" in her memory.

She is listed as #72 by Blood Horse on their list of top 100 U.S. thoroughbred champions of the 20th Century and in 1996 was inducted into the National Museum of Racing and Hall of Fame.

As part of the "Thoroughbred Legends" series, in 2000, author Bill Heller published a book about the filly titled "Go For Wand." - Eclipse Press

Pedigree

References
 Go For Wand's pedigree
 Go For Wand at the United States' National Museum of Racing and Hall of Fame

1987 racehorse births
1990 racehorse deaths
Racehorses bred in Pennsylvania
Racehorses trained in the United States
Horses who died from racing injuries
Thoroughbred family 2-f
Filmed deaths of animals
Breeders' Cup Juvenile Fillies winners
Du Pont racehorses
United States Thoroughbred Racing Hall of Fame inductees
Eclipse Award winners